A Pwi pwi is type of miniature raft, native to Dominica. They were carved out of tree trunks, usually Bois Canon (Cecropia peltata)  by the Kalinago people, very simple in design, used for inshore fishing for fish, lobster, shellfish and conch.

References

External links
Photograph

Rafts
Dominica culture